Espanola High School is located in the town of Espanola, Ontario, approximately 70 km from downtown Greater Sudbury.   Espanola High School shares a building with A.B. Ellis Public School, Contact North, and the One Tot Stop Daycare.

The school is overseen by the Rainbow District School Board.

Notable achievements

Ringette 

In the early 1960s, the Espanola Parks and Recreation director, Mirl Arthur "Red" McCarthy, experimented with and developed the first official set of rules for the sport of ringette upon the request of Sam Jacks, the President of the Society of Directors of Municipal Recreation of Ontario (SDMRO), using girls ice hockey players from Espanola High School. The games were played at the Espanola Arena.

Jazz  

Espanola's various jazz bands did very well at the  MusicFest Canada 2006 Festival, specifically in the Instrumental Jazz Division Competition.

Notable alumni 

 Terrence Young, former CEO of the largest law firm in the world, Dentons.

See also
List of high schools in Ontario

References

High schools in Ontario
Espanola, Ontario
Schools in Sudbury District
Educational institutions in Canada with year of establishment missing